Anavitrinella pampinaria, the common gray, is a moth of the family Geometridae. The species was first described by Achille Guenée in 1857. It is found in most of North America except the Arctic regions, south to Mexico.

The wingspan is 23–34 mm. The color of the forewing varies from medium gray to light yellowish-gray with heavy dark gray or black mottling. The first abdominal segment forms a pale whitish band, bordered proximally by a black line. This black line extends onto the base of the hindwing and onto the forewing, then curves forward but usually breaks before reaching the costa. The postmedial line is wavy and toothed. The subterminal line is white, scalloped or zigzagged. The hindwing color and pattern is similar to that of the forewing.

Adults are on wing from April to October.

The larvae feed on Malus, Fraxinus, Trifolium, Pyrus, Populus and Salix species. The larvae are light brown and mimic twigs. The head is flat-faced, mottled with tan, white, black and occasionally pink. There are often black spots forming a dark blotch to either side of the triangle.

References

External links

Boarmiini
Moths described in 1857
Moths of North America